Borgatti is an Italian surname. Notable people with the surname include:

Giuseppe Borgatti (1871–1950), Italian singer
Renata Borgatti (1894–1964), Italian classical musician
Stephen Borgatti (born 1956), American business professor and author

Italian-language surnames